Virgibacillus natechei is a Gram-positive and moderately halophilic bacterium from the genus of Virgibacillus which has been isolated from sediments from a saline lake from Bechar in Algeria.

References

Bacillaceae
Bacteria described in 2016